The Bloch MB.480 was a French twin-engined torpedo-bomber/reconnaissance floatplane designed just before the start of the Second World War by Société des Avions Marcel Bloch.  Only two were built, the French Navy deciding to use landplanes instead.

Design and development
In May 1937, the French Air Ministry placed an order with Société des Avions Marcel Bloch for two prototype floatplanes intended to fulfill a French Navy requirement for a twin-engined torpedo-bomber/reconnaissance floatplane.  Bloch's design, the Bloch MB.480 was a low-winged monoplane that closely resembled the earlier Bloch MB.131 reconnaissance/bomber landplane. It was powered by two 1,060 hp (791 kW) Gnome-Rhône 14N radial engines and carried a crew of five.  Defensive armament was a 7.5 mm Darne machine gun in the nose and a ventral bath, while a 20 mm cannon was fitted in a powered dorsal mounting. A heavy load of bombs, torpedoes or auxiliary fuel tanks could be carried in an internal bomb bay.

The first prototype made its maiden flight from Étang de Berre in June 1939. The aircraft's twin tail was raised to avoid spray on take-off and landing, and the tail fins were cropped to restore a good field of fire for the dorsal cannon after the tail assembly had been raised. The second prototype flew in October 1939.

Operational history
Although testing was relatively successful, the French Navy had meanwhile decided that the torpedo-bomber reconnaissance role could be better met by landplanes, with the much faster Lioré et Olivier LeO 451, already on order as a medium bomber for the French Air Force, being chosen.  On 9 September 1939, Bloch was told to suspend development trials, while on 10 December it was officially announced that no orders would be placed for either the MB.480 or its two competitors, the SNCAC NC-410 and the Loire-Nieuport 10.

The first prototype was destroyed after colliding with a pier on Étang de Thau on 23 June 1940, while the second prototype was placed into storage in July, and was not flown again.

Specifications

See also

Notes

References

Green, William. War Planes of the Second World War: Volume Six, Floatplanes. London:Macdonald, 1962.

External links
Aviafrance
Photo

MB.480
1930s French military reconnaissance aircraft
Floatplanes
Low-wing aircraft
Aircraft first flown in 1939
Twin piston-engined tractor aircraft